H-Craft Championship is a science fiction racing game developed by independent game studio Irrgheist. The game was built using the free graphics engine Irrlicht for Windows, Linux and Android. In 2007 the game was released in digital distribution internationally by Manifesto Games and in a Russian version released by Akella. In 2014, after a long downtime, the developers released the game as freeware. On February 25, 2015 the source code was released as open-source under the zlib license. The media files remain proprietary.

Gameplay 
The game features various hovercraft which race on superhighways in the sky, meaning that an important part of the game involves staying on track and not falling to the ground. It features several different games modes: "Championship" acts as the single-player campaign, while "Rival " allows for multiplayer games with up to four players in sequence. In addition it also features "Arcade" and "Time attack" game modes.

Reception 
Although not widely known, what reviews there are for the game are generally positive. Play This Thing praised the games graphics, stating they were an impressive accomplishment for an independent game. AllForLinux included it in its list of top Linux games, and LinuxLinks included it as part of their list of "42 of the Best Commercial Linux Games". It also holds a four out of five star rating at The Linux Game Tome

See also 
Ballistics
List of open source games

References

External links 
H-Craft Championship - Official Website

Android (operating system) games
Racing video games
Indie video games
Windows games
Linux games
2007 video games
Video games developed in Germany
Science fiction racing games
Open-source video games
Commercial video games with freely available source code
Free and open-source Android software
Akella games
Multiplayer and single-player video games
Multiplayer hotseat games